Painesville Township is one of the five townships of Lake County, Ohio, United States. The population was 20,399 at the 2010 census. It is part of Greater Cleveland in the Northeast Ohio Region, the 15th largest combined statistical area in the United States.

Name and history
Long occupied by various indigenous peoples, the area was not settled by European Americans in any number until after the Revolutionary War. Early on, this land was considered part of the Connecticut Western Reserve. General Edward Paine (1746–1841), who had served as a captain in the Connecticut militia during the war, arrived in 1800 with a party of 66 settlers. General Paine later represented the region in the territorial legislature of the Northwest Territory.

Lake County was established on March 6, 1840, from land given by Cuyahoga and Geauga counties, and derived its name from its location on the southern shore of Lake Erie. The county seat, Painesville, was named after General Paine, and the county was divided further with the creation of Perry, LeRoy, Painesville, Mentor, Kirtland, and Concord Townships.

Geography
Painesville Township contains four major disjunct sections. Located in the northern part of the county along Lake Erie, it borders the following townships and city:
Perry Township - east
LeRoy Township - southeast corner
Concord Township - south
Mentor - west

Several municipalities are located in Painesville Township:
The village of Fairport Harbor, in the northwest along the lakeshore
The village of Grand River, in the northwest
The unincorporated community of Painesville-on-the-Lake, in the north center

The township surrounds the city of Painesville, but is separate from it.

The township boundaries extend north to the center of Lake Erie and the Canadian border.

Government
The township is governed by a three-member board of trustees, who are elected in November of odd-numbered years to a four-year term beginning on the following January 1. Two are elected in the year after the presidential election and one is elected in the year before it. There is also an elected township fiscal officer, who serves a four-year term beginning on April 1 of the year after the election, which is held in November of the year before the presidential election. Vacancies in the fiscal officership or on the board of trustees are filled by the remaining trustees. Painesville Township has voted on several occasions on whether or not to merge with Painesville City. The township has voted to stay independent of the city primarily to maintain its lower real estate tax structure and support its separate school system.

Transportation and economy
Major transportation routes in the township are U.S. Route 20 and State Routes 2, 84 and Ohio State Route 44. Painesville Township is located just north of Interstate 90 and is easily accessed via Route 44. Two major railroads, CSX and Norfolk Southern, pass through the township and serve some of the township's industries. Additionally, Amtrak's Lake Shore Limited passes through on the CSX line. However, these trains do not stop in the township.

Painesville Township is home to several industries, including a large Lubrizol facility, Avery Dennison, and Nova Chemicals.

Education
Painesville Township is home to the Riverside Local School District, formerly the Painesville Township Local Schools. Its schools include Riverside High School, John R. Williams Junior High School, Lamuth Middle School and four elementary schools. Painesville city and Fairport Harbor operate their own school districts, while  Grand River village, Leroy and Concord township students attend Riverside's schools.

Recreation
Painesville Township is home to the Lake County Fair, which is held every August. Events such as harness racing and tractor pulling competitions, as well as concerts performed by big name country music bands, take place at the fair.

Nearly 80% of Headlands Beach State Park is in Painesville Township; the remainder lies in the neighboring community of Mentor. The beach is the longest natural beach in Ohio. The US Coast Guard has a base in the township located just east of Headlands Beach.

Notable people 
 Dan O'Shannon, writer and producer.

References

External links

Lake County website

Townships in Lake County, Ohio
Townships in Ohio
Urban townships in Ohio
Cleveland metropolitan area